Grace Lin (born May 17, 1974) is a Taiwanese-American children's writer and illustrator. She is a Newbery, Geisel, and Caldecott honoree, known for contributing to and advocating for Asian-American representation and diversity in children’s literature. She has published over 25 books, all of which are written for young and middle-grade audiences. Much of her work features young Asian and Asian-American characters in both everyday and fantastical settings.

Early life and education
Lin was born in New Hartford, New York to Taiwanese immigrants  in 1974 Jer-Shang Lin, a doctor, and Lin-Lin Lin, a botanist.  She grew up in upstate New York, where she and her two sisters, Beatrice and Alice, were the only Asian students at their elementary school. Lin started creating books during her childhood, and in seventh grade, she entered a national book contest for students, winning fourth place and $1000.

She later attended Rhode Island School of Design, graduating in 1996 with a BFA in children's book illustration.

Career

Writing and illustration 
After graduating from RISD and failing to garner attention from publishers, Lin worked for a giftware company, where she designed t-shirts and mugs. After a couple of years, she got laid off from that job and decided to pursue her dream of being a children’s book author and illustrator. A senior editor from Charlesbridge Publishing contacted Lin after taking notice of her illustration samples, inquiring if she had a story to go along with these illustrations. At the time, Lin did not have a story ready, but told the editor that she did. Eventually, she created a corresponding story for these samples, ultimately publishing her first book, The Ugly Vegetables, in 1999. She has since published over 25 books, many of which she illustrated herself. Lin continues to write and illustrate. Some of her work is housed in the University of Connecticut archives.

Other work 
In 2016, Lin gave a TEDx presentation entitled “The Windows and Mirrors of Your Child’s Bookshelf,” in which she advocates for increased awareness of diversity in children’s books. Since 2017, Lin has written nine commentaries for the New England Public Radio, most often writing about her personal experiences as a parent and Asian-American author. In 2017 and 2018, she appeared on PBS NewsHour, speaking on representations of race and culture in children’s literature.  Lin hosts two podcasts, Book Friends Forever and Kids Ask Authors, started in 2019 and 2020 respectively. She also sits on the advisory committee of We Need Diverse Books, a non-profit organization that promotes diversity in children's literature.

Personal life 
She married Robert Mercer, an architect and fellow RISD alum, in 2001.  When he was diagnosed with Ewing's sarcoma, a rare type of cancer, he and Lin moved to Montreal created the fundraiser Robert’s Snow: For Cancer’s Cure based on Lin’s children’s book, Robert’s Snow. Lin and Mercer invited children’s book illustrators to paint wooden snowflakes ornaments which were then auctioned off to raise money for cancer research. The fundraiser auction was held twice, raising over $100,000.  Upon Mercer’s death in 2007, the fundraiser was discontinued. She remarried in 2010 to Alexandre Ferron, with whom she has a daughter, Hazel, born in 2012. Lin resides in Florence, Massachusetts with her family.

Style and themes

Themes 
Lin often writes about cultural and racial identity, as well as peace and relationships between friends and family. Many of Lin’s works revolve around the experiences of Asian and Asian-American characters, and she often draws directly from her own personal experiences, particularly in her Pacy series. By featuring Asian American protagonists in everyday situations and emphasizing diversity within the Asian American experience, argues Duke University Professor Susan Thananopavarn, Lin’s books confront and subvert both Western and global stereotypes surrounding the AAPI community. She also incorporates elements from traditional Chinese and Taiwanese fantasy folktales, which are most evident in her Where the Mountain Meets the Moon series.

Illustration style 
Lin’s illustration style uses bright colors, graphic shapes, and intricate, layered patterns. Lin illustrates all her work by hand, with a preference for gouache. Lin developed her current illustration style during her senior year at RISD. Lin has noted that her inspiration stems from a combination of traditional Chinese folk art and the work of European artists such as Matisse and Van Gogh.

Awards and reception 
Lin has won multiple literary awards for her work, including a Newbery Honor for Where the Mountain Meets the Moon in 2010, a Theodor Seuss Geisel award for Ling and Ting: Not Exactly the Same! in 2011, a National Book Award finalist for When the Sea Turned Silver in 2016, and a Caldecott Honor for A Big Mooncake for Little Star in 2019. Many of her books have received starred reviews from outlets such as Publishers Weekly, Kirkus Reviews, School Library Journal, and Horn Book Magazine, and she has been nominated for numerous awards throughout her career.  In 2016, she was recognized as one of ten Champions of Change for AAPI Art and Storytelling by the Obama administration, and her art was shown in the White House. Furthermore, in recognition of her "significant and lasting contribution to literature for children," Lin won the 2022 Children's Literature Legacy Award.

List of works

Author and illustrator

Pacy series

 The Year of the Dog, Little, Brown (New York, NY), 2006. ISBN 978-0316060028
 The Year of the Rat, Little, Brown (New York, NY), 2007. ISBN 978-0-316-02928-5
 Dumpling Days, 2012. ISBN 978-0316125895

Where the Mountain Meets the Moon series 

 Where the Mountain Meets the Moon, BOOK 1 Little, Brown Books for Young Readers, 2009. ISBN 978-0316038638
 Starry River of the Sky, BOOK 2 2012. ISBN 978-0316125956
 When the Sea Turned to Silver, BOOK 3 Little, Brown (New York, NY), 2016. ISBN 978-0316125949

Ling & Ting series

 Ling & Ting: Not Exactly the Same!, Little, Brown (New York, NY), 2010. ISBN 978-0316024532
 Ling & Ting Share a Birthday, Little, Brown (New York, NY), 2013. ISBN 978-0316184045
 Ling & Ting: Twice as Silly, Little, Brown (New York, NY), 2014. ISBN 978-0316184021
 Ling & Ting: Together in All Weather, Little, Brown (New York, NY), 2015. ISBN 978-0316335492

Other works 

 The Ugly Vegetables, Charlesbridge (Watertown, MA), 1999. ISBN 978-0-88106-336-3
 Okie-dokie, Artichokie!, Viking (New York, NY), 2003. ISBN 978-0670036233
 Olvina Flies, Henry Holt (New York, NY), 2003. ISBN 978-0-8050-6711-8
 Robert's Snow, Penguin (New York, NY), 2004. ISBN 978-0670059119
 Jingle Bells, Little, Brown (New York, NY), 2004. ISBN 978-0316794947
 Fortune Cookie Fortunes, Alfred A. Knopf (New York, NY), 2004. ISBN 978-0440421924
 Deck the Halls, Little, Brown (New York, NY), 2004. ISBN 978-0316794930
 The Twelve Days of Christmas, Little, Brown (New York, NY), 2004. ISBN 978-0316794961
 Merry Christmas! Let's All Sing!, Little, Brown (New York, NY), 2005. ISBN 9780316794909
 Olvina Swims, Macmillan, 2007, ISBN 978-0-8050-7661-5
 Our Seasons, Charlesbridge (Watertown, MA), 2006. ISBN 978-1-57091-360-0
 The Red Thread: An Adoption Fairy Tale, Albert Whitman and Company, 2007, ISBN 978-0-8075-6922-1
 Bringing in the New Year, Alfred A. Knopf, 2008, ISBN 978-0-375-83745-6 
 Thanking the Moon: Celebrating the Mid-Autumn Moon Festival, Alfred A. Knopf, 2010, ISBN 9780375861017 
 A Big Mooncake for Little Star, Little, Brown, 2018, ISBN 9780316404488 
 Mulan: Before the Sword, Disney Press, 2020, ISBN 978-1368020336

Illustrator 

 Roseanne Thong, Round is a Mooncake: A Book of Shapes, Chronicle Books (San Francisco, CA), 2000. ISBN  9780811826761 
 Paul Yee, The Jade Necklace, Crocodile Books (New York, NY), 2001. ISBN 9781896580074 
 Dim Sum for Everyone!, Alfred A. Knopf (New York, NY), 2001. ISBN 978-0-375-91082-1
 Roseanne Thong, Red is a Dragon: A Book of Colors, Chronicle Books (San Francisco, CA), 2001. ISBN 9780811864817
 Dana Meachen Rau, My Favorite Foods, Compass Point Books (Minneapolis, MN), 2001. ISBN 9780756500764
 Frances Park and Ginger Park, Where on Earth Is My Bagel?, Lee & Low (New York, NY), 2001. ISBN 9781584300335
 Cari Meister, A New Roof, Children's Press (New York, NY), 2002. ISBN 9780516223698
 Kite Flying, Alfred A. Knopf (New York, NY), 2002. ISBN 978-0-375-81520-1 
 C.C. Cameron, One for Me, One for You: Little Ideas for Caring for Yourself and the World, Roaring Brook Press (Brookfield, CT), 2003. ISBN 9781250275578
 Kathy Tucker, The Seven Chinese Sisters, Albert Whitman (Morton Grove, IL), 2003. ISBN  9780807573105
 Roseanne Thong, One is a Drummer: A Book of Numbers, Chronicle Books (San Francisco, CA), 2004. ISBN  9780811837729
 Eleanor Roosevelt and Michelle Markel, When You Grow Up to Vote: How Our Government Works for You, Roaring Brook Press (Brookfield, CT), 2018. ISBN 9781626728790

References

External links
 
Old Blog
Blog
 
"Interview with author/illustrator Grace Lin", Paper Tigers, Aline Pereira
"Q & A with Grace Lin", Publishers Weekly, Julie Yates Walton, July 8, 2010
 
A video interview with Grace Lin
Grace Lin Papers at University of Connecticut

 American children's writers
 American writers of Taiwanese descent
 Newbery Honor winners
 Living people
 Rhode Island School of Design alumni
 American writers of Chinese descent
 American women writers of Chinese descent
21st-century American novelists
20th-century American women writers
21st-century American women writers
 Place of birth missing (living people)
1974 births
20th-century American writers
 American women children's writers
 American women novelists
 Writers who illustrated their own writing